Bowlditch Quarry is a 0.25 hectare geological Site of Special Scientific Interest near the village of Clandown, Bath and North East Somerset, notified in 1952.

The site provides a remarkable attenuated and broken succession stretching from the top of the Rhaetian to the lowest Pliensbachian periods. This Lias section provides a good example of biostratigraphic principles.

References

Sites of Special Scientific Interest in Avon
Sites of Special Scientific Interest notified in 1952
Quarries in Somerset